The Kawasaki KLX250S is a dual-purpose motorcycle. In 2009, Kawasaki released their supermoto inspired KLX 250SF to the public. It is a relatively lightweight dual sport which can be used both on and off road. Its 249 cc engine has a top speed of 85 mph.

First generation (2006-2007)

Specifications

Second generation (2009-2020)

Specifications

Differences from previous generation
 All-digital instrument console
 New, stiffer seat
 New fender shape and headlight
 Thicker spokes
 Increased fuel capacity
 New swing arm design
 Less front and rear suspension travel
 Slightly less ground clearance
 Supermoto inspired KLX 250SF version available for 2009 and 2010 model years

References

KLX250S
Dual-sport motorcycles
Motorcycles introduced in 2006